Samuel Bottomley (born 14 June 2001) is an English actor. He began acting at the age of nine, when he made his professional debut in the 2011 film Tyrannosaur. After portraying Brandon Kelleher on the CBBC series Rocket's Island, Bottomley went on to appear as Jordan Wilson on the Channel 4 school drama Ackley Bridge, followed by roles on Kiss Me First and Ladhood. He then played Dean Paxton in the 2021 film adaptation of Everybody's Talking About Jamie, after which he was cast in television series including The Teacher and Somewhere Boy.

Early life
Bottomley was born on 14 June 2001 in Wibsey, Bradford. Bottomley was a member of the Buttershaw St Paul's Amateur Operatic Dramatic Society, and in 2014, he joined The Yorkshire School of Acting at the Bradford Playhouse.

Career
At the age of nine, Bottomley made his professional acting debut in the 2011 drama film Tyrannosaur. He then appeared in the 2012 film Private Peaceful as the younger version of Tommo. Later that year, he began portraying the role of Brandon in the CBBC series Rocket's Island, a role he portrayed until 2015. From 2017 to 2018, Bottomley portrayed the role of Jordan Wilson in the Channel 4 school drama Ackley Bridge. In 2019, he starred in the comedy film Get Duked! as Ian. In the same year, he began starring in the iPlayer series Ladhood as Ralph Roberts. In 2021, he starred in the film Everybody's Talking About Jamie, in the role of Dean Paxton. Also in 2021, Bottomley was cast in the Channel 5 drama The Teacher, which aired in early 2022. This was followed by his casting in the Channel 4 comedy-drama series Somewhere Boy.

Filmography

References

External links
 

2001 births
21st-century English male actors
English male child actors
English male film actors
English male television actors
Living people
English LGBT actors
LGBT male actors
Male actors from Bradford